John Strahan was an architect working in Bristol and Bath, England in the early 18th century. He died around 1740.

List of works
 Shakespeare Public House, Bristol (1725)
 Combe Hay Manor Combe Hay 1728 to 1730
 Frampton Court, Frampton-on-Severn
 Avon Street, Bath
 New King Street, Bath
 Beaufort Square, Bath
 Kingsmead Square, Bath
 Rosewell House, Bath, Kingsmead Square, Bath 1736
 Redland Chapel Bristol (1742)

References

18th-century English architects
Year of death unknown
Year of birth unknown
Architects from Bristol